HNLMS De Ruyter was a  (pantserschip) of the Royal Netherlands Navy. The ship was built by the Maatschappij voor Scheeps- en Werktuigbouw Fijenoord in Rotterdam just after  the turn of the 20th century.  The ship participated in two colonial expeditions in the Dutch East Indies. She made several journeys to show the flag and was finally decommissioned in 1923.

Description
The main armaments of the ship were two  single turret guns. Secondary armaments included four single  guns and eight  single guns. The ship had a complement of 340 men.

Service history
After being laid down in 1900, De Ruyter was built by the Maatschappij voor Scheeps- en Werktuigbouw Fijenoord in Rotterdam and launched on 28 September 1901. She was commissioned on 29 October 1902 and subsequently deployed to the Dutch East Indies.

On 24 June 1905  hit a coral reef near Matjidosteen while en route to the Gulf of Boni.  made several attempts to pull the stranded ship loose, but these proved  unsuccessful and were abandoned when Zeelands bollards broke. The ship was later pulled clear after De Ruyter and Japara, a ship with towing equipment from the Koninklijke Paketvaart Maatschappij,  arrived and Hertog Hendriks coal, reserves and munitions were offloaded. Later that year De Ruyter, Hertog Hendrik,  and two ships of the Koninklijke Paketvaart Maatschappij took part in an expedition to South Celebes where they engaged in operations against the lord of Loewoe. An infantry battalion and a marine landing party were set ashore near Palopo and later that day the soldiers and marines took the lord's palace. 

In 1906 De Ruyter, along with her sister ship, and the protected cruiser Zeeland, assisted in an expedition to the island of Bali as part of Dutch attempts to integrate the southern kingdoms of Tabanan, Badung and Klungkung into the Dutch East Indies. On 16 and 17 September, the ships bombarded the city of Denpasar and afterwards ground forces broke what resistance remained.

On 15 December 1908 the ship left the port of Den Helder for Curaçao to reinforce the Dutch squadron that had been stationed off the Venezuelan coast following political tension between the two nations.

After this, the ship made two voyages around the Asia-Pacific to show the flag. The second voyage was undertaken the following year, when De Ruyter and both her sister ships, Koningin Regentes and Hertog Hendrik, sailed to Australia after leaving the port of Surabaya on 15 August 1910. Brisbane, Melbourne, Sydney and Fremantle were included among the ports that were visited during this journey.

The ship was finally decommissioned in 1923.

References

Coastal defence ships of the Royal Netherlands Navy
1901 ships
Ships built at Maatschappij voor scheeps- en werktuigbouw Fijenoord, Rotterdam